Mohammed Magdy  (born 7 July 1993) is an Egyptian professional footballer who plays for Zamalek SC as a defender.

Honours

Zamalek SC

Egypt Cup (1): 2017_18

References

External links
 

1993 births
Living people
Egyptian footballers
Egypt international footballers
Association football defenders
Al Masry SC players
Zamalek SC players
Egyptian Premier League players